Legal Wives is a Philippine television drama series broadcast by GMA Network. It aired on the network's Telebabad line up and worldwide via GMA Pinoy TV from July 26, 2021 to November 12, 2021.

Series overview

Episodes

References

Lists of Philippine drama television series episodes